is a Japanese manga series written and illustrated by Daisuke Moriyama. It was serialized by Shōnen Gahosha's seinen manga magazine Young King OURs from April 2005 to May 2014, with its chapters collected in thirteen tankōbon volumes. The story follows a group of humans who combat monstrous creatures that spread around by using cell-phone signals.

Plot
At the start of the series, high-schooler Riku Amami receives a cellphone picture from his dead step sister Amane with a hospital in the background. When he visits the said building, he is attacked by electromagnetic monsters called Kanshu, which travel and reproduce using cellphone signals: if a human hears his cellphone giving off an eerie static sound, his body is then gruesomely converted into a Kanshu or suffers irreversible infection. Riku is saved by two warriors, Rena and Youhei, who wield Jinki weapons designed to destroy Kanshu. During the battle, however, Riku finds a cocoon, out of which hatches a toddler looking exactly like Riku's dead step sister Amane. As the situation goes downhill, Riku ends up receiving his own Jinki and gets drawn into the shadowy organization that fights the Kanshu.

Characters 

 Riku is a high-school student who lives with his father (absent for most of the story) and stepmother, Shizuru. He was in love with Shizuru's younger sister, Amane, but she is presumed dead two years ago in a fire. After sustaining, at the start of the series, a fatal wound from a Kanshu, Neene turns Riku into a special Kanshu that can retain his own consciousness as long as he has a Jinki. His Jinki, gained through Youhei's sacrifice, takes the form of a chainsaw-like sword with trigger grip. Despite his desperate efforts to keep Neene out of harm's way and public knowledge, F.L.A.G eventually sets its sights on the young hybrid and puts Riku under custody, only for the two of them to escape with the director as hostage. After the source of infection take Neene he has disappeared. He reappeared in the battle of the rubble tower only to disappear for three months in the aftermath, reappearing in a cocoon of light. In his Jinki form, Riku retains his white hair and markings from his kanshu transformation; due to multiple sightings, the online community has started to call "Suraga". He is an extremely strong Jinki user, able to damage Kagomari while others can not touch them.

 Neene is a "Coffin Princess" who appears to be a toddler about two years old, but has an uncanny resemblance to Riku's dead aunt Amane. Neene was hatched from a cocoon at the start of the story, and grows at a rapid rate, experiencing a growth spurt triggered each time she uses her powers in a Kanshu fight. As the series progresses, she demonstrates various powers, such as turning Riku into a Kanshu after he is mortally wounded in a fight as well as creating a giant ball of light that disintegrates anything it touches or envelops. She is eventually revealed to be a Kyuki, a queen Kanshu who receives the memories stolen by other "drone" Kanshu, and her growth is directly linked to the absorption of additional memories. She has recently gained more power and is capable of manipulating memories and manifesting wings and has left with the source of infection. During the battle of the rubble tower she fought off ende but was seemingly killed off protecting Riku. Due to her two protectors' close proximity, Neene has started calling Riku "papa" and Rena "mama". After realizing his feelings were for Amane despite her feeling being for him the most important thing. Her last words were "Liar." She later reappears about three months after the incident at the rubble tower, having already grew up into a teenager, close in age to both Riku and Rena, and established a living quarters inside an abandoned building overseeing the city though no motives for her return and where she vanished to after her fight with Ende have been disclosed, as of the moment. Her most recent growth spurt can be speculated to be due to feeding off the cores from inactive Jinki users slain by a "kamogari" or black kanshu, which it returns to Neene's side to deliver her the cores and keeping her company as a way to protect her. When this black kanshu slaughters some Jinki users whom Riku made friends with, he follows in pursuit alerting Neene of his presence. Neene, then, has the black kanshu to lure Riku to where she is hiding much to the boy's shock and skepticism once she finally reveals her new self before him. Neene's current form, after the three months time skip, suggests that she has developed a yandere-like personality given that her eyes now look vacant and dead, but still she affectionately fawns over Riku when she greets him as her "Papa".

 Rena is a young Jenki user who is depicted as a quiet and serious person focused on her job, who frequently takes the lead when fighting Kanshus. Her Jinki is Shingetsu, a pair of chakrams with a trigger-like grip that allows the four blades of each Shingetsu to spin. After Youhei's death, she becomes Riku's partner, whom she appears to have become attracted to, after their meeting with the Source of Infection. Later on, it is revealed she is a "lost re-bound" victim; the person who disappeared was someone she considered a mentor. She then had a flood of memories ending with the vision of a masked person. Her hometown was on Hatsumi island, which everyone had forgotten due to a Kanshu attack. She is currently looking for Riku and Neene, who disappeared after holding F.L.A.G.'s director hostage. In the battle of the rubble tower she fought a black kanshu who fought similar to her father. She disappeared with Riku for three months after the end of the battle.

 Youhei is a Jinki user and Rena's initial partner. He is depicted as an optimistic and cheerful person. Before the series began, he and Riku met during their stay at the hospital and became fast friends. At the start of the series, Youhei and Rena rescued Riku when he was first attacked by Kanshus. His Jinki resembles a short blade and was given to him by his teacher, to save him from Kanshu-inflicted wounds. In an ironically similar situation, Youhei ends up entrusting his own Jinki to a wounded Riku. At his own request, he is beheaded by his old friend before he could become a complete Kanshu.

 Takao is a Jinki Hunter who seeks Neene's power in order to defeat the elusive Source of Infection. He is a widely discussed mass murderer, having taken dozens – perhaps hundreds – of lives since he became a Hunter two years ago. To aid him in fights against Jinki Users, he uses the captured Jinki cores of past slain users to boost his power tremendously – enough to shatter Cages with a single hit. To top it off, he is highly skilled with his katana. He is in contact with a mysterious person by the name of Julie and appears to have once been betrayed by an individual called Shiro. Even with a ruined hand, he nevertheless remained skilled enough to fight Joe, Clara, Riku and Rena all at once, only retreating when he found out his 'Time' was up. He however does not depart without giving riku advice about Neene. In the latest chapter, it is revealed he has met Yui and accidentally wounded her while trying to protect her eventually leading to her death as the rushed to the hospital. His real name is Takao Ryuusei. He is the master of Coffin Princess "Julie."

 Shirou Karasawa is a mysterious figure depicted as the source of Kanshus. Unnamed at first, he appears as a man in a suit wearing a kitsune mask who visits Riku and uses his mask to confuse and recruit the young man. He is the former director of Flag and uses a special device to access to Flag's computer systems. He has promised Neene that he will help her discover herself and her origins. He uses her power to awaken Coffin Princess "Ende" but was soon killed off by Kazama. His last connection allowed him enough time to beg Neene to stop Ende, who was on a rampage at the Master's death.

 Tougo Kazama is a childhood friend of Riku's. He managed to recognize Riku as Suraga and while being hunted down by Takao, he awoke to a Jinki core. He later explains that two months earlier, during the NEFT building fire, a bright light (one of the Jinki cores from chapter 15 that Takao lost against Riku) came crashing towards him. The glowing scar he retained from the incident disappeared the next morning. His core has a scratch causing him intense pain, and he cannot materialize a blade, forcing F.L.A.G. to engineer a customized weapon for his own use. He sniped Karasawa in the battle of the Rubble Tower and has since then spent three months training in Riku's absence.

Publication

Written and illustrated by Daisuke Moriyama, World Embryo was serialized in Shōnen Gahōsha's seinen manga magazine Young King OURs from April 30, 2005, to May 30, 2014. Shōnen Gahosha collected its chapters in thirteen tankōbon volumes, released from March 2, 2006, to September 30, 2014.

The series was licensed for an English language release in Singapore by Chuang Yi, in Australia by Madman Entertainment, and in North America by Dark Horse Comics (although they never released any volume of the series). It was also licensed in Italy by J-POP Edizioni, and in France by Kazé Manga (formerly Asuka). in Russia by Comics Factory.

References

External links
 

Action anime and manga
Dark Horse Comics titles
Science fantasy anime and manga
Seinen manga
Shōnen Gahōsha manga
Madman Entertainment manga